is a town located in Kamo District, Gifu Prefecture, Japan. , the town had an estimated population of 10,303 and a population density of 250 persons per km2, in 3876 households.

Geography
Kawabe is located on the edge of the Nōbi Plain in southern Gifu Prefecture. The Hida River  flows through the town, which 70% forest and hills.  The town has a climate characterized by characterized by hot and humid summers, and mild winters  (Köppen climate classification Cfa).  The average annual temperature in Kawabe is 15.0 °C. The average annual rainfall is 2058 mm with September as the wettest month. The temperatures are highest on average in August, at around 27.6 °C, and lowest in January, at around 3.1 °C.

Neighbouring municipalities
Gifu Prefecture
Minokamo
Hichisō
Yaotsu

Demographics
Per Japanese census data, the population of Kawabe has remained relatively steady over the past 50 years.

History
The area around Kawabe was part of traditional Mino Province. During the Edo period, it part of Kamo District, and was tenryo directly controlled by the Tokugawa shogunate.  During the post-Meiji restoration cadastral reforms, the area was organised into Kamo District, Gifu Prefecture. The town of Kawabe was formed on April 1, 1897 with the establishment of the modern municipalities system. Kawabe merged with neighbouring Kamiyoneda on April 1, 1955.

Education
Kawabe has three public elementary schools and one public middle school operated by the town government. The town does not have a high school.

Transportation

Railway 
 Central Japan Railway Company - Takayama Main Line 
 -

Highway

Local attractions 
 Kawabe Dam

Notes

External links

 

 
Towns in Gifu Prefecture